The Boss Dr. Sample SP-202 is a discontinued sampling workstation made by Boss Corporation, a division under Roland Corporation. Released in the year of 1998, it is the premier installment to the SP family, which includes Boss’s popular SP-303 and Roland's SP-404 installments. The sampler is also successor to Roland's MS-1 Digital Sampler.

Features

Being an early installment, the SP-202 has a limited number of features which were later improved and expanded on through future installments/upgrades of the SP lineage:

 8 large pads, 4 banks, two control knobs, with overall display and operation that was later enhanced with the Boss SP-303
 Compact, easy-to-use portable sampler—perfect for club DJs, hip-hop and dance music artists, and other sampling musicians
 Innovative BPM function calculates BPM from sample length for easy looping*
 6 built-in effects including Pitch Shift, Filter 1 & 2, Time Stretch, Delay, Ring Modulation
 Sampling time — 4 min. 20 sec. internal, up to 37 min. using optional 5 volt SmartMedia card (2mb or 4mb supported)
 User-selectable sampling grade programmable for each pad
 Built-in microphone for sampling any time, any place
 Import/export WAV/AIF via SmartMedia card slot
 Runs on battery or AC power

Musicians
A number of musicians have used the SP-202 as part of their production and performance. Several artists include Fatboy Slim, as well as Tobacco.

See also
 Roland MS-1 Digital Sampler
 Boss SP-303
 Boss SP-505

References

Further reading

External links
 SP-202: Dr. Sample
 SP-Forums.com - An active forum dedicated to Roland's SP range

Samplers (musical instrument)
Roland
Boss Corporation
Workstations
Roland synthesizers
Grooveboxes
Music sequencers
Sound modules
Music workstations
Hip hop production
Japanese inventions